Čista proza is the only studio album by the Serbian new wave band Čista Proza from Novi Sad, released by PGP RTB in 1983. The album was released on LP only, and has not been reissued not CD.

Track listing 
Source: Discogs

Personnel

Čista Proza 
 Đorđe Pilipović — bass, vocals
 Hati En Bakoš — drums, guitar
 Milan Ćirić — guitar, vocals
 Steva Mijučić — vocals, guitar

Additional personnel 
 Ivan Ćulum — artwork by [design]
 Fazekaš Tibor — keyboards
 Zoran Stojšin — keyboards
 Josip Kovač "Kiki" — saxophone
 Ivica Vlatković — recorded by

References 
 NS rockopedija, novosadska rock scena 1963-2003, Mijatović Bogomir; Publisher: SWITCH, 2005

1983 debut albums
Čista Proza albums
PGP-RTB albums